On April 20, 1818, Thomas B. Robertson (DR) of  resigned.  A special election was held to fill the resulting vacancy.

Election results

In addition, Robertson himself received 16 votes, presumably unsolicited.  Butler took office on November 16

See also
List of special elections to the United States House of Representatives

References

Louisiana 1818 at-large
1818 at-large
Louisiana 1818 at-large
1818 Louisiana elections
Louisiana at-large
United States House of Representatives 1818 at-large
April 1818 events